Phooka may refer to:
 Púca, a creature of Celtic folklore
 Cow blowing, a disputed process to induce a cow to produce more milk